"Juke Box Boy" is an Italo disco song recorded by the Italian act Baltimora and released as the group's only single in 1986. The song itself did not appear on any original studio album although it was included on the 1986 Canadian edition of the band's first album Living in the Background and on the album's 1993 re-issue as a bonus track. The single had a promotional video created.

Despite the promotional video, the single failed to make much impact worldwide, only peaking at #12 in Italy and #33 in Belgium.

The single was mixed at Paradise Studios in Munich while the US radio version was mixed at Avatar Studios, New York (formerly known as the Power Station).

Formats
7-inch single
"Juke Box Boy" - 3:58
"Pull the Wires" - 4:46

12-inch single
"Juke Box Boy" - 5:50
"Pull the Wires" - 4:46
"Juke Box Boy" (U.S.A. Radio Version) - 3:50

Personnel
 Maurizio Bassi – producer, arranger
 Maurizio Cercola – artwork
 Fabio Nosoti – photography

Charts

References

1986 songs
1986 singles
Baltimora songs
EMI Records singles
Songs written by Maurizio Bassi